Dat Nguyen (born October 10, 1982) is a Vietnamese-born American boxer and bare-knuckle boxer. He recently competed in the Bare Knuckle Fighting Championship and was the BKFC Lightweight Champion.

Early life 
When Dat was eight years old, his mother decided to leave Vietnam to give her family a better life. She brought Dat and his five siblings to Hawaii where he grew up on the island of Maui. In eighth grade, Dat won his first Junior Olympic Championship and went on to win the Men's State Championship and Hawaii Golden Gloves. In 2001, Dat graduated with Honors and was awarded a full Scholarship to Northern Michigan University, site of one of the three United States Olympic Training Centers. He spent three years studying Computer Information Systems while representing the USOEC in National and International competitions as an Olympic Hopeful.

Boxing career 
During his time at the U.S. Olympic Training Center, Dat was the first Vietnamese-American to win a silver medal at the National Golden Gloves and a bronze medal at the 2003 U.S. Championships that earned him spot at the U.S Men's Challenge to qualify for the first Olympic spot. In the U.S Challenge, Dat fought Mickey Bey (the eventual 2004 Olympian) but lost to him on a tie breaker.

Following his departure from the U.S Olympic Education Training Center, Dat decided to turn professional and made his debut on May 1, 2004 in Atlantic City, New Jersey. Dat won his first professional fight by knocking out Ernest Scott in the first round.

Bare-knuckle boxing 
In 2019, Nguyen signed with the Bare Knuckle Fighting Championship. 

On October 19, 2019, he made his bare-knuckle debut against Travis Thompson at BKFC 8: Silva vs. Gonzaga. Nguyen won by unanimous decision.   

On February 15, 2020, Nguyen defeated Abdiel Velasquez by first-round knockout at BKFC 10: Lombard vs Mundell.      

Dat Nguyen was scheduled to face Johnny Bedford for the BKFC Lightweight Championship at BKFC 16: KnuckleMania on February 5, 2021. After a hard-fought five-round war, Nguyen came out on top by judges decision to become the new BKFC Lightweight Champion. He subsequently called out Jonny Beltran for his next bout.

On June 10, 2021, BKFC president Dave Feldman revealed that the organization and Nguyen were unable to come to terms regarding a new contract, leading to the title being stripped and making Nguyen a free agent.

Fighting style  
Nguyen is a boxer puncher with hand speed and power, who likes to beat up the body. He is promoted by King's Promotions, the leading promoter for Premier Boxing Champions (PBC). "Dat brings a ton of charisma coupled with great skill into the ring and I am happy to showcase his talents," said DiBella.

"Boxing is not my mother's first choice for me" said Nguyen. "But she encourages me to give 100% to anything I do. This is the thing I choose to do, "said Nguyen

Nguyen is trained by known teacher and former legendary fighter James "Buddy" McGirt in Vero Beach, Florida where Nguyen now lives. "He will be a champion" said McGirt.

Championships and accomplishments  
 Bare Knuckle Fighting Championship (BKFC)
 BKFC Bantamweight Championship (one time)

Professional boxing record

Bare knuckle record

|-
|Loss
|align=center|3–1
|Luis Palomino
|Decision (unanimous)
|BKFC 22: Lombard vs. Hunt
| 
|align=center|5
|align=center|2:00
|Miami, Florida, United States
|
|-
|Win
|align=center|3–0
|Johnny Bedford
|Decision (unanimous)
| Bare Knuckle FC KnuckleMania
|
|align=center|5
|align=center|2:00
|Lakeland, Florida, United States
|
|-
|Win
|align=center|2–0
|Abdiel Velazquez
|KO (punches)
|Bare Knuckle FC 10
|
|align=center|1
|align=center|1:51
|Fort Lauderdale, Florida, United States
|
|-
|Win
|align=center|1–0
|Travis Thompson
|Decision (unanimous)
|Bare Knuckle FC 8
|
|align=center|5
|align=center|2:00
|Tampa, Florida, United States
|
|-

References

http://www.premierboxingchampions.com/news/unbeaten-130-pound-prospect-flores-heading-home-battle-nguyen-february-21#.WIuF_ia1bkY.facebook

http://www.premierboxingchampions.com/fight-night-february-21-2017

http://www.abramsboxing.com/undefeated-prospect-miguel-flores-faces-top-contender-dat-nguyen-main-event-premier-boxing-champions-toe-toe-tuesdays-fs1-boxeo-de-campeones-fox-deportes-tuesday-february-21-silve/

External links

1982 births
Living people
People from Đồng Nai Province
American sportspeople of Vietnamese descent
Featherweight boxers
Lightweight boxers
Bare-knuckle boxers 
American male boxers
Sportspeople of Vietnamese descent
World boxing champions
Vietnamese emigrants to the United States
Boxers from Hawaii